Pehr August "P.A." Peterson (September 8, 1846 – June 10, 1927) was a Swedish-born business executive, civic leader, and philanthropist in Rockford, Illinois, United States. Peterson was founder and president of numerous furniture and machine tool manufacturing companies and one of the founders of Swedish American Hospital.

Background
Peterson came from Ving, in the historical province of Västergötland, Sweden. His father was a tailor. In 1852, when Pehr was six, the Peterson family immigrated to America and Rockford, Illinois. After four years the family settled on a farm in nearby Cherry Valley, Illinois. Young Peterson worked on farms for years.

Career
Peterson set off on his own to work in Wisconsin in lumber camps and sawmills, as well as in Chicago as a bookkeeper. He later put himself through business college. In 1875, he moved back to Rockford and began his career in the city's growing furniture industry. By the early 1890s Rockford was the second-greatest furniture-manufacturing city in the United States (Grand Rapids, Michigan, was number one), with over two dozen companies, and P.A. directed over a quarter of them. He branched into leadership of several machine tool and other manufacturers, into banking, and in his later years even founded a department store.

Rockford Union Furniture Company was organized in 1876. Pehr August Peterson was elected company secretary because he could keep books. John Erlander served as president, and his brother-in-law Jonas Peters served as treasurer-manager.  Rockford Union Furniture Company was a cooperative association, with members helping to raise the initial capital for the business. It was the first of twenty-five area furniture factories that were formed as cooperatives.

When the Union Furniture plant burned down in August 1889, Peterson built another factory a mile away. By 1892 seven of twenty-five Rockford furniture companies were directed by Peterson. The Panic of 1893 hit Rockford hard, resulting in the closure of twenty-seven factories in one day alone, including many Swedish-American furniture factories. P.A. himself went broke trying to keep his many interests afloat but turned down advice to declare bankruptcy. Instead, the former multicompany president worked at sales for a furniture firm just to keep steady income rolling in. By 1896 P.A. had repaid so much of his debt that the old creditors started to return businesses to his leadership and ownership.

From this point P.A.'s trajectory upward was virtually uninterrupted, and he became the most important figure in Rockford's industrial, commercial, and civic development for the next 31 years. Altogether, P.A. would come to own stock in fifty Rockford-based companies. He was one of the founders of the Swedish Building and Loan Association. Peterson served as president of Sundstrand Corporation. His diverse interests included Rockford Drop Forge, Rockford Class Bending Works, Rockford Life Insurance, Rockford Mitre Box, Mechanics' Machine, Haddorff Piano, Mechanics Tool, National Lock and Free Sewing Machine.

In 1911, in response to a great need for more healthcare services, Rockford's Swedish-American community, under the leadership of P.A. Peterson, decided to build a new hospital on the East Side. (Most of Rockford's Swedes, including Peterson, were Lutherans who lived on the East Side, which had only the Roman Catholic St. Anthony's Hospital.) Peterson was the chairman of the board of trustees of Swedish American Hospital when it finally opened its doors on July 17, 1918 (construction had been slowed by the Great War), and served in this capacity until June 23, 1919.

Personal life
P.A. and his wife, Ida, had no children of their own, but they adopted two girls. For years they lived at 1219 Seventh Street. P.A. never drove a car, so this location was ideal for walking: halfway between the heart of Rockford's Swedish-American commercial center, farther north up Seventh Street, and the east–west line of factories (and railroad tracks) stretching across the south end of the East Side, fronting along 18th Ave.

In 1918 Peterson purchased the Lake-Peterson House, as it is now known, as a private residence. This was at the time that P.A. was chairman of the new Swedish-American Hospital on Charles Street, and the house was directly north at 1313 E. State St. Peterson donated the Lake-Peterson House to Swedish-American Hospital in 1919, provided he and his wife be allowed to remain in it until they died. The somewhat oddly Gothic-tinged Victorian structure, on Rockford's main east–west street (State St. is U.S. 20, running from Chicago out to Dubuque, Iowa), is today used for hospital executive offices and is on the National Register of Historic Places.

Peterson was a deeply religious member of Trinity Lutheran Church, one of several Rockford churches belonging to the Evangelical Lutheran Augustana Synod in North America (the Augustana Synod was the main Swedish-American denomination in America). He was a contributor to other churches, as well, and the Anti-Saloon League. He was reputedly very generous not only with his peers (even competitors) among Rockford's business leadership but also with his companies' workers, often cosigning loans for them and giving personal checks to their widows.

Long before Peterson died in 1927 at age 80, he'd had an elementary school named after him. P.A. Peterson School stood on 21st Ave. between 8th and 9th Sts., a few blocks south of his old house on 7th St. and not far beyond the factories fronting on 18th Ave. On the day of Mr. Peterson's funeral, many Rockford commercial and industrial firms stayed closed in honor of Rockford's first citizen.

Peterson bequeathed one-half million dollars to "build a home for the Swedish aged of Rockford." The P.A. Peterson Home for the Aged finally opened in 1941 in a beautiful building at 1311 Parkview Avenue, on what was then the city's northeast edge, overlooking Sinnissippi Golf Course. (The home, not restricted to Swedish Americans, is now called the P.A. Peterson Center for Health and is a program of Lutheran Social Services of Illinois) In his will P.A. also gave another one-half million dollars to the Foreign Mission Board of the Augustana Synod and a like sum to establish a Rockford branch of the Young Men's Christian Association.

References

Additional sources
Lundstrom, Linden J  Centennial: 1854-1954, The First Evangelical Lutheran Church (Rockford, Illinois:  The First Evangelical Lutheran Church. 1954)

External links
First Lutheran Church. Rockford, Illinois. Records
Lutheran Social Services of Illinois
Lake Peterson Home
Rockford Drop Forge

1846 births
1927 deaths
People from Västergötland
Swedish emigrants to the United States
American Lutherans
People from Winnebago County, Illinois
People from Rockford, Illinois
Businesspeople from Illinois
Philanthropists from Illinois